The 2005 NCAA Division II women's basketball tournament was the 24th annual tournament hosted by the NCAA to determine the national champion of Division II women's  collegiate basketball in the United States.

Washburn defeated Seattle Pacific in the championship game, 70–53, to claim the Ichabods' first NCAA Division II national title.

The championship rounds were contested at the Summit Arena in Hot Springs, Arkansas.

Regionals

East - Anderson, South Carolina
Location: Abney Athletic Center Host: Anderson University

Great Lakes - Allendale, Michigan
Location: Grand Valley Field House Host: Grand Valley State University

North Central - Grand Forks, North Dakota
Location: Betty Engelstad Sioux Center Host: University of North Dakota

Northeast - North Andover, Massachusetts
Location: Volpe Complex Host: Merrimack College

South - Conway, Arkansas
Location: Jeff Farris Center Host: University of Central Arkansas

South Atlantic - Raleigh, North Carolina
Location: Spaulding Gym Host: Shaw University

South Central - Springfield, Missouri
Location: Weiser Gymnasium Host: Drury University

West - Seattle, Washington
Location: Royal Brougham Pavilion Host: Seattle Pacific University

Elite Eight - Hot Springs, Arkansas
Location: Summit Arena Hosts: Henderson State University and Hot Springs Convention Center

All-tournament team
 Carla Sintra, Washburn
 Lora Westling, Washburn
 Juwanna Rivers, Washburn
 Amy Taylor, Seattle Pacific
 Carone Harris, Central Arkansas

See also
 2005 NCAA Division I women's basketball tournament
 2005 NCAA Division III women's basketball tournament
 2005 NAIA Division I women's basketball tournament
 2005 NAIA Division II women's basketball tournament
 2005 NCAA Division II men's basketball tournament

References
 2005 NCAA Division II women's basketball tournament jonfmorse.com

 
NCAA Division II women's basketball tournament
2005 in sports in Arkansas